Andrew Whitford (born 17 March 1965) is a New Zealand former cyclist. He competed in the team pursuit event at the 1988 Summer Olympics.

References

External links
 

1965 births
Living people
New Zealand male cyclists
Olympic cyclists of New Zealand
Cyclists at the 1988 Summer Olympics
Sportspeople from Manchester
Commonwealth Games medallists in cycling
Commonwealth Games silver medallists for New Zealand
Cyclists at the 1986 Commonwealth Games
20th-century New Zealand people
Medallists at the 1986 Commonwealth Games